Harry Saunders was a footballer.

Harry Saunders may also refer to:

Harry Saunders (priest) (1913–1967), Archdeacon of Macclesfield
Harry Saunders (economist), see Khazzoom–Brookes postulate
Harry Saunders, inspiration for Harry's War

See also
Henry Saunders (disambiguation)
Harold Saunders (disambiguation)